Paramelania damoni is a species of tropical freshwater snail with an operculum, an aquatic gastropod mollusk in the family Paludomidae.

The specific name damoni is in honor of Robert Damon from Weymouth, who collected the type specimen.

Distribution 
The distribution of this species includes Lake Tanganyika in Burundi, the Democratic Republic of the Congo, Tanzania, and Zambia.

The type locality is Lake Tanganyika.

Description 
Paramelania damoni was originally described by Edgar Albert Smith in 1881. Smith's original text (the type description) reads as follows:

The width of the shell is 28 mm. The height of the shell is 37 mm.

Paramelania crassigranulata was recognized as a form of this species by Brown (1994).

Ecology 
This snail lives in Lake Tanganyika in depths 1.5–65 m. It lives on the bottom consisting of fine sediment, rocks or sand.

References 
This article incorporates public domain text from the references

Paludomidae
Gastropods described in 1881
Taxonomy articles created by Polbot